Eighth grade (or grade eight in some regions) is the eighth post-kindergarten year of required education in the US. The eighth grade is the ninth school year (not including pre-school), the second, third, fourth, or final year of middle school, or the second and/or final year of junior high school, and comes after 7th grade. Usually, students are 13-14 years old in this stage of education. Different terms and numbers are used in other parts of the world.

Africa
In Cameroon, Form 3 (8th Grade) is the third year of middle school.
In Morocco, 8th grade is the second year of middle school.
In Nigeria, Grade 8 (JSS2) is the second to last year of Junior high, as there are no middle schools in the Nigerian education system, elementary school (primary school) ends in grade 6. Pupils (called learners by the Department of Education) are between the ages of 13 and 14.
In Somalia, the eighth grade, which pupils are between the age of 12 and 14, is typically the final grade before high school.
In South Africa, Grade 8 is the first year of high school. It is required that a learner leaving grade seven registers online for admissions to the eighth grade in order to be recognised by the Department of Education.

Asia
In Iran, 8th grade is second year of high school A. There are 2 stages of high school in Iran, A and B. A ranges from Grade 7 (13 years old) across Grade 8 (14 years old) to Grade 9 (15 years old).
In India, 8th grade is the last grade before high school. 8th grade exam is the second last year the respective school will be setting the examination. Thereafter in tenth grade, the examinations are conducted by state or national boards. In India, 8th class education falls under the middle education system and the curriculum for 8th grade students typically includes subjects such as mathematics, science, social studies, languages and elective subjects.
In Sri Lanka, 8th grade is the last grade before high school. 8th grade exam is the last year the respective school will be setting the examination. Thereafter (ninth grade and after) the examinations are conducted by state or national board.
In Pakistan, Grade 8 is one of the years in middle school. Students in this class are thirteen to fourteen years old. 8th grade exams are conducted and managed by the Boards of Education in Pakistan.
In Nepal Grade 8 is last grade before Secondary Education. In Grade 8, District Level Examination is conducted by District Education Office.
In the Philippines, Grade 8 or Sophomore Year is the second year of Junior High School and High School curriculum. Topics mainly discussed are the following subjects like, for the major subjects are Intermediate Algebra (Math in Grade 8), Biology (Science in Grade 8), Filipino subject with Florante at Laura, English and World History (Political Studies in Grade 8). Values Education, World Literature, MAPEH (Music, Arts, Physical Education and Health), Computer and TLE (Technology and Livelihood Education) are some of the minor subjects. Students are usually 13–14 years old. It was formerly named as 2nd Year or Year II until it changed to Grade 8 on June 3, 2013, upon the start of School Year 2013-2014 due to the implementation of the K-12 curriculum.
In Singapore, 8th grade is equivalent of Secondary 2 level.
In Malaysia, 8th grade also known as Form 2 in secondary school. The students at this stage are 14 years old, and it is the second year in the secondary school.
In Indonesia, 8th grade is known as Kelas 2 SMP (Indonesian for the number 2). Pupils usually are aged from 13 to 14 years old and graduate from Kelas 1 SMP in the middle of the year (June 18 but the promotion to the next grade is at June 28).
In Hong Kong, 8th grade is called Form 2.
In Afghanistan, 8th grade is the final year of middle school.
In Oman pupils usually are aged from 14 to 15 years old.
In Saudi Arabia, 8th grade is the second year of middle school.
In Mongolia, 8th grade is the third year of middle school. Usually children in 8th-grade ages from 13 to 14.

Europe
 In Spain, eighth grade was called 8º de EGB (Educación General Básica) and is the last year in a colegio, before being enrolled into an instituto (Spanish for High School). However under the current ESO (educación secundaria obligatoria) system it is now the second year of ESO.
 In Sweden, eighth grade is called 8:e klass, or Åttan for short. It's the second last year before enrolling into a Gymnasium, similar to high school. Pupils are aged 14–15 during eighth grade.
 In Denmark, eighth grade is called 8. Klasse being the second last year before being enrolled into a Gymnasium, which is similar to high school.
 In France, eighth grade is equivalent to the third year of collège, the Quatrième or '4ème'.
 In Germany, eighth grade is called 8. Klasse.
 In Turkey, eighth grade is called 8. Sınıf and is the last year in an ortaokul (middle school in Turkish), before being enrolled into a lise (high school in Turkish). Students are usually aged 13-14.
 In Greece, aged 13–14, eighth grade is called second year of gymnasium school or middle school or lower secondary school (Deutera Gymnasiou – Δευτέρα Γυμνασίου).
 In Poland, eighth grade is called 8. klasa. It's the last year of elementary school (szkoła podstawowa). Pupils are aged 13–15.
 In Hungary, eighth grade is called 8. osztály, commonly the last year of elementary school. Other systems to group the grades are also present: for example, six years of elementary school then six years of high school; or four years of elementary then eight years of high school.
 In Finland, children aged 14–15 are usually in 8th grade. 8th grade is called 8. luokka in Finland.
 In Iceland, eighth grade is called 8. bekkur. Pupils are aged 13–14.
 In Ireland, eighth grade is equivalent to 2nd Year. Students are between 13 and 14 years old at the beginning of the year.
 In Italy, eighth grade is the final year of middle school. It is equivalent to what is colloquially referred to as terza media or  terzo anno delle scuole medie (officially Scuola secondaria di primo grado). Students are usually between 13 and 14 years old.
 In Latvia, eighth grade is called 8. klase. Children are aged 14–15.
 In the Netherlands, eighth grade is equivalent to the second year in secondary school (known as de tweede klas).
 In Norway, the eighth grade is the first year of Ungdomsskole (literally Youth School), equivalent to Junior High School. The students enter the eighth grade the year they turn thirteen.
 In Portugal, the eighth grade is called 8 Ano and pupils are aged between 12 and 13
 In Belgium, eighth grade is the equivalent to the second year in middle school (called "2de middelbaar" or "2e secondaire").
 In the United Kingdom:
In the English and Welsh school systems, eighth grade is equivalent to Year 9 (Form 3). These children are aged 13–14.
In Scotland eighth grade is equivalent to S3 ('S' represents Secondary), or 3rd year. In Scotland students start primary education at an age of 4–5 and then move to high school when 11–12. Children are between 13 and 14 years old in this year.
In Northern Ireland, children aged 13–14 are in year 10 or 3rd year (secondary school).
In Romania, 8th grade is called "Clasa a VIII-a", and it is the last year of Gymnasium, followed by high school. Children usually aged between 13 and 14 are in this grade.
In Croatia 8th grade is called "Osmi razred" and it is the last year of primary education before going to gymnasium or another secondary school. Children are ages between 13 and 14. Grades beyond 8th are not called 9th and so on, but rather 1st grade of secondary school.
In Slovenia, 8th grade is the second to last year of primary school, with students 13–14 years of age. After primary school, students attend different High Schools.
 In Bulgaria, children aged 13–15 are usually in 8th grade, which is the 1st year of high school.
in Kosovo, children aged 13–14 are in third year of middle school. In the old education system eighth grade was the first year of high school.

North America
 In Belize, Std. 6 is the last year in elementary school.
 In Mexico, eighth grade is equivalent to the second year of middle school for those who are aged 13–14.

Canada
Grade 8 typically forms a part of elementary or middle schools in Canada. In some parts of Canada (such as Newfoundland), and much of British Columbia, grade 8 is the first year of secondary school. Students are usually 12–13 years old. In Quebec, grade 8 is equivalent to Secondary II (French: 2e Secondaire ("2")) or Secondary Cycle 1, Year 2.

The grade 8 mathematics curriculum in Canada usually includes either Pre-algebra or Algebra I. Occasionally, Geometry, or Algebra II are also taught in very advanced schools. In some schools, especially the ones that are witnessing the required Basic Standards Test, basic everyday "real world" mathematical skills such as check writing, money management, and geometry are taught as well.

United States
In the United States, Eighth Grade is usually a child's eighth year of education, aside from Kindergarten and Preschool. It is often the final year of middle school. Some students take English 1 and or Algebra 1 which are high school classes.

In cultural and language curriculum, many students may opt to take a foreign language course, either for a semester or the full school year.
 
In the United States, American history is often the primary focus in eighth grade social studies.  Other schools may also focus on other subject areas such as geography and world history.

In Mathematics, 8th graders learn about scientific notation, geometry and angles, linear equations, measurement, functions, and exponents. In Science, 8th graders are in physical science and learn about forces and motion, energy, the electromagnetic spectrum, and chemical reactions. In English, 8th graders learn about themes, imagery, figurative language, textual evidence, analyzing sources, writing narratives, writing research reports, writing explanatory essays, writing persuasive and argumentative pieces, and compare and contrast.

In the United States, 41 states have implemented Common Core curriculum standards for English/Language Arts and Mathematics in 8th grade.

Key English/Language Arts Common Core standards for 8th grade students include:

 Ability to write arguments and to support claims with relevant evidence; support with logical reasoning using accurate, credible source
 Write narratives to develop real or imagined experiences using relevant details and structured event sequences
 Ability to write in a manner that the organization, development, and style are appropriate to the task, purpose and audience
 Conduct short research products to answer questions, drawing on multiple print or digital sources; ability to assess credibility of each source

Key Mathematics Common Core standards for 8th grade students include:

 Ability to use linear equations and systems to represent, analyze, and solve various problems
 Students recognize (y/x=m) or (y-mx) as special linear equations (y=mx+b) and can interpret and express a relationship in terms of the situation
 Students understand the concept of a function as a rule that assigns exactly one output for one input
 Knowledge of distance and angles and ideas of translations, congruence, rotations, reflections, similarity
 Apply the Pythagorean Theorem to find distance between points on the coordinate plain, find lengths, and analyze polygons

Oceania
 In Australia, this is called Year 8, which is the second year of high school.
 In New Zealand, Year 9 is the equivalent of eighth grade, with students aged 13 or 14 at the beginning of the year. It is the first year of high school. Students in Year 9 typically study English, mathematics, science, social science, health and physical education, arts and technology.

South America
All students must be 13 years old before March 31 or May 31 depending on school.
 In Chile, eighth grade is equivalent to 8° Básico the last year of Enseñanza básica for those who are aged 13–14.
 In Perú  eighth grade is equivalent to 2do de secundaria, the second year of secondary education (also called "Media"), for those who are aged 13 to 14. 
 In Argentina eight grade is called 2do de secundaria, which means it's the 2nd grade of secondary school

See also
Educational stage
Secondary education

References

8
Secondary education